The Helen DeVos Children's Hospital (HDCH) is a nationally ranked, freestanding, 241-bed, pediatric acute care children's hospital located in downtown Grand Rapids, Michigan. It is affiliated with the Michigan State University College of Human Medicine and is a member of the Spectrum health system, the only children's hospital in the system. The hospital provides comprehensive pediatric specialties and subspecialties to infants, children, teens, and young adults aged 0–18 throughout Grand Rapids region and features an ACS verified level I pediatric trauma center. Its regional pediatric intensive-care unit and neonatal intensive care units serve the region. It is named for Helen DeVos, wife of Amway founder Richard DeVos, a major donor.

Overview
The hospital offers 40 pediatric specialty services. The hospital received Magnet Recognition status by the American Nurses Credentialing Center 2009. The hematology, oncology and bone marrow transplant program received the American Society of Clinical Oncology Award for the program's work to improve cancer care through clinical research, one of eight hospitals in the U.S. to receive this recognition.

The hospital built a 14-story children's hospital at 100 Michigan St. NE in downtown Grand Rapids. The building opened January 11, 2011.

In 2008, the hospital implemented a collaborative program with Priority Health called the Children's Healthcare Access Program that provides children enrolled in Medicaid more access to primary care.

Awards 
The hospital ranks in 8 pediatric specialties nationally, and ranks as the second best children's hospital in Michigan after C.S. Mott Children's Hospital on the U.S. News & World Report.

See also
 List of children's hospitals in the United States
 Grand Rapids Medical Mile

References

Hospital buildings completed in 1970
Hospital buildings completed in 2011
Hospitals in Michigan
Children's hospitals in the United States
Skyscrapers in Grand Rapids, Michigan
Skyscrapers in Michigan
1970 establishments in Michigan
DeVos family
Hospitals established in 1970
Pediatric trauma centers